Gallimaufry, A Collection of Essays, Reviews, Bits, is a 2020 collection of 57 essays, book reviews, and shorter pieces all by Joseph Epstein. Essay topics in this collection include authors, literature, biographies, writing, language (its use and misuse), universities, culture, Chicago and humor. The collection is organized into three sections: (i) Essays and Reviews, longer pieces, #1-39 below, (ii) Bits and Pieces, shorter pieces, #40-56 below and (iii) Edward Redux, an essay on his friend and mentor Edward Shils. All of these essays were previously published in journals and anthologies including The Weekly Standard, Commentary (magazine), Claremont Review of Books, Wall Street Journal and others.

Essays collected

Reception

In The American Spectator  Larry Thornberry said "I consider Epstein to be the finest essayist and columnist on active duty today." Thornberry appreciated the wide variety of topics taken up in this collection. He concluded with: "(Epstein's) work is a kind of literary palate cleansing."

At Anecdotal Evidence  Patrick Kurp said: "At age eighty-three, Epstein remains our most entertaining, wide-ranging, industrious, learned practitioner of both familiar and critical essays."

References 

Essay collections
Essays about culture
Essays about literature